The Rehab People of the Year Awards was an annual awards ceremony in Ireland organised by the Rehab Group, televised by RTÉ television.

The People of the Year Awards were given to people who "bring joy and light to the lives of others or have supported others in their darkest hours". The nominees were chosen by members of the public. The winners were then chosen by a panel of adjudicators, composed of leading members of the media, voluntary sector and business community.

The awards had for many years been held in December of each year. The 2018 edition, awarded for nominations made in 2017, was held in April, having been postponed from February due to Beast from the East weather event. No ceremony was held in 2019.

Award categories

 The International Person of the Year - awarded to an Irish person who has made an outstanding contribution on an international level, or to a person from outside Ireland who has made a positive impact to life on the island.
 The Young Person of the Year - for exceptional achievements by a young person (aged 25 or under).
 Sports Person of the Year
 Community Group of the Year
 People of the Year Awards

Complete list of winners

2010s

2018
(for year 2017)
 Local historian Catherine Corless, for her work in exposing the treatment of Women and the bodies of children at the Bon Secours Mother and Baby Home, in Tuam, County Galway
 The community of Ballaghadereen for its welcoming response to the Syrian refugee crisis
 Colette Byrne, Everyday Hero, for founding widow.ie, a website which helps people who have lost a spouse
 Ifrah Ahmed, International Person of the Year, founder of the Ifrah Foundation, for her work in campaigning to end female genital mutilation
 Harry and Molly Flynn, Young people of the Year, for saving the life of their little sister Isabelle during several apnea episodes
 Fr. Peter McVerry S.J. (second time awardee), for a lifetime dedication to helping the homeless
 Vera Twomey, for her campaign, including a 260 km walk to Dublin, to legalise medicinal cannabis on behalf of her daughter Ava who has Dravet syndrome
 The Irish Coast Guard, for the heroic work of the men and women who risk, and sometimes lose, their lives to assist maritime and coastal communities
 The community of Erris for its support in the search and rescue operation following the 2017 Irish Coast Guard Rescue 116 crash
 Joy Neville, Sports Person of The Year, Rugby referee and grand slam winning rugby international
 Galway county hurling team, Sports People of the Year, for winning the 2017 All-Ireland Senior Hurling Championship

2016

 Robbie Keane, International Person of the Year for "service leadership and passion" as captain of the Republic of Ireland national football team and charity ambassador
 Davitt Walsh for rescuing an infant in the Buncrana tragedy
 Paul and Gary O'Donovan, and Annalise Murphy, Sports Person of the Year (Joint), for their performances at the Rio Olympics
 Alan Herdman, Young Person of the Year, for rescuing 8 children from drowning in Rusheen Bay
 AMEN for its work in supporting male victims of domestic abuse.
 Brother Kevin Crowley for running the Capuchin Day Centre for the homeless
 John Muldoon and Pat Lam for leading Connacht Rugby to its first Pro12 victory
 Róisín and Mark Molloy, for highlighting maternity service inequalities across the Irish health service
 Ireland's Paralympic medallists for their performances at Rio 2016

2015

 John Evoy of the Irish Men's Sheds Association for contributing to male mental health and wellbeing
 Padraic Mangan and Aoibhean Godwin, Young People of the Year for founding FarmSafety4Kids
 Philip Grant, Irish Consul, California, and Fr. Brendan McBride, International People of the Year, for their efforts following the Berkeley balcony collapse
 Fadhili Haji, of Sports Against Racism Ireland and Football Against Racism in Europe for her work in encouraging Muslim girls to play football
 Ade Stack and Marty Curley, for assisting parents and families of sick children, through the founding of Hugh's House, which provides accommodation near the Rotunda Hospital and the Temple Street Children's University Hospital
 Yes Equality (Gay and Lesbian Equality Network, Irish Council for Civil Liberties, Marriage Equality Ireland) for their campaign to amend the Constitution 
 Paul O'Connell, former Munster and Irish rugby captain, Sports person of the Year
 Ken Maleady, for saving a life by delivering CPR during the Dublin City Marathon
 Óglaigh na hÉireann for the work of the Irish Naval Service in protecting life in the Mediterranean during the European migrant crisis.

2014

 Rory O'Neill/Panti, People of the Year Award winner. For his public contributions in fighting for equality and freedom of expression.
 Paul Kelly, People of the Year Award winner. For his work with Console - a Suicide Prevention, Intervention and Postvention Service.
 Maurice McCabe and John Wilson, People of the Year Award winners. For exposing irregularities in the work of the justice system.
 The Society of Saint Vincent de Paul, Community Group of the Year. For its work as a leader in the homeless and hunger charity sector.
 Owen Condon, Every Day Hero Award, in association with the Nicky Byrne Show with Jenny Greene, RTÉ 2FM. For saving the life of a friend.
 Adam Horgan, Joint Young Person of the Year Award. For rescuing two people from drowning near Youghal, Co. Cork.
 Shane Kennedy, Joint Young Person of the Year Award. For the care he gives to his younger brother who has Cri du chat syndrome.
 Mary and Tony Heffernan, People of the Year Award winners. For their work with the Saoirse Foundation which helps children affected by Batten disease, and the BUMBLEance, children's ambulance service.
 Tomi Reichental, International Person of the Year award 2014. For raising awareness of the Holocaust, since his family moved to Ireland in the 1950s.
 Louise O’Keeffe, People of the Year Award winner. For her struggle to expose the abuse she and others suffered during her school days in 1973.

2013

 Fiona Doyle, People of the Year Award winner. For her courage, determination and bravery in fighting for her own rights and the rights of survivors of abuse.
 Loretta Brennan Glucksman, International Person of the Year winner. In recognition of her tireless work, dedication and commitment, her extraordinary philanthropic efforts with the American Ireland Fund and her generosity of spirit.
 Detective Garda Adrian Donohoe, Person of the Year Award winner. For his dedication in protecting the ordinary citizens of Ireland, and for his bravery and courage in the line of duty, Detective Garda Adrian Donohoe was posthumously awarded a People of the Year Award..
 Donal Walsh, Joint Young Person of the Year (posthumous). For his courage, strength, determination and desire to show young people the true value and meaning of life, and for being an inspiration to so many people, Donal Walsh was posthumously awarded a Young Person of the Year Award.
 Fabian Lugandu, People of the Year Award. For his bravery and fearlessness when he came to the rescue of Liz O’Brien and her son Derek, and for his quick thinking and courage, which ensured that Liz and her son returned home safely that day, Fabian Lugandu was awarded a People of the Year Award.
 Joe Prendergast, Joint Young Person of the Year. For his motivation, determination and successful achievements, Joe Prendergast was awarded the Young Person of the Year Award.
 Irish Women's Rugby Team, Sports Person of the Year. For their skill, passion and dedication in achieving their success, for capturing the hearts of the nation and breaking down barriers for women's sport in Ireland, the Ireland women's rugby team received a People of the Year Award.
 Orla O'Sullivan, People of the Year Award. For her determination, her incredible talent and for acting as an inspiration for others with a disability to follow their dreams, Orla O’Sullivan was awarded a People of the Year Award.
 Tom Arnold. People of the Year Award. For his commitment and energy as a leading and tireless advocate in the fight against hunger and malnutrition across the world Tom Arnold was presented with a People of the Year Award.
 Ciarán Finn, Dad of the Year (in association with 2fm's Breakfast with Hector). For being a dedicated dad who goes above and beyond for his children, for teaching skills in a novel and fun way and for being an inspiration to those around him, Ciarán Finn received the Dad of the Year Award in association with 2fm's Breakfast with Hector.
 Brendan O'Carroll, People of the Year Award. For his services to the Irish entertainment industry and his ability to bring a smile to the faces of so many people, Brendan O’Carroll was awarded a People of the Year Award.

2012
 Gill Waters, People of the Year Award winner, for her innovation in pioneering Today FM's Shave or Dye Campaign for the Irish Cancer Society and for creating vital public dialogue around cancer.
 Adventurer Mark Pollock, People of the Year Award winner, for his determination in overcoming significant physical adversity and constantly pushing out new boundaries as an explorer and adventure racer.
 Maeve Flaherty, from Ballinteer in Dublin, winner of the 2012 special award category Neighbour of the Year, for her fantastic neighbourly spirit and selflessness in supporting people in difficulty. The award was presented in association with RTÉ 2fm's  Tubridy. 
 Katie Taylor, Sports Person of the Year, for her outstanding sporting achievements, most recently as an Olympic Gold medallist, and for being a proud ambassador for Ireland Boxer.
 Dr. Tony Scott, of University College Dublin, People of the Year Award winner, for his immense contribution to the field of science in Ireland and co-founding of what is today known as the Young Scientist Exhibition.
 The people of Union Hall, County Cork, winner of Community Group of the Year, for its outstanding community spirit and unshakeable resolve in efforts to find five fishermen lost at sea on the Tit Bonhomme near Glandore Harbour.
 Joanne O'Riordan, Young Person of the Year, for her determination in highlighting the challenges faced by people with disabilities today.
 The late Garda Ciarán Jones, posthumous winner of a People of the Year Award, for the enormous bravery, heroism and selflessness shown by him in losing his life in trying to protect others in the floods of Winter 2011 in Manor Kilbride County Wicklow.
 Cork Penny Dinners, People of the Year Award winner, for providing food and warmth to those in need in Cork for over 100 years.
 Broadcaster Colm Murray People of the Year Award winner, for his courageous response to a diagnosis of motor neuron disease, and his inspirational efforts in speaking out about the condition and the need for a cure.
 The 2012 Irish Paralympic Team People of the Year Award winner, for its inspiring sporting achievements at the London 2012 Paralympic Games and a record haul of 16 medals.

2011
 Rory McIlroy, named Sports Person of the Year, for winning the US Open Golf Championship in June 2011 becoming its youngest winner since 1923,  and tying or breaking 12 Open records.
 The Ireland cricket team for winning a match against England at the 2011 Cricket World Cup
 Police Constable Ronan Kerr (age 25), (posthumously) for his service in the PSNI, having been killed by a bomb in  Omagh in April 2011
 Sharon Malloy, from Co. Laois, named Best Friend of the Year in a special award for 2011, for her support to a friend battling drug addiction
 The community of Skerries in North Co. Dublin, named Community of the Year for its extraordinary solidarity in the search for two men who went missing at sea in April 2011
 Edith Wilkins, named International Person of the Year for her compassion and unfaltering commitment to improving the lives of the people of India, and for providing a safe haven to the most vulnerable in society
 Joan Freeman for her work in establishing Pieta House, the only service of its kind in Ireland to provide counselling and support for those who are actively suicidal, are contemplating suicide, or who self-harm
 Jackie Kelly (18 years), from Co. Tipperary, named Young Person of the Year for being a positive role model in supporting her mum who had been diagnosed with cancer and for her determination to pass her Leaving Cert
 AJ McCullough (21 years) for his heroic efforts in his brave and courageous rescue of the Attah family when their car plunged into the Boyne Canal in Drogheda in December 2010
 The Tall Ships Festival Waterford 2011 for the enormous voluntary and community effort which led to a hugely successful festival, with more than 500 volunteers providing support

2010
Owen O'Keefe
Catherine McGuinness
Dr. Louise Ivers and Gena Heraty
The families of victims of Bloody Sunday
Emma Fogarty, Epidermolysis bullosa campaigner 
Rio Hogarty
Graeme McDowell
Limerick's Garda Síochána's Community Policing Unit
Gerry Ryan
Gay and Lesbian Equality Network

2000s

2009
 Bernadette Lanigan
 Sarah Kavanagh
 Debbie Deegan
 The Irish Rugby Team
 Brian O’Driscoll
 Steve Collins, father of gang-victim Roy Collins, for working to end gang violence in Limerick
 Christine Buckley
 Michael O’Brien
 David Kelly
 Eleanor Thomson
 Sylvia Meehan
 Irish Hospice Foundation

2008
 Rose Uí Shúilleabháin
 Fr Shay Cullen
 Ronan Hayes
 Orla Tinsley, Young Person of the Year
 Keith Duffy
 Nuala O'Loan
 Scouting Ireland
 Robert McLoughlin
 Joe Dolan
 Kenny Egan, Darren Sutherland & Paddy Barnes

2007
 Pádraig Harrington
 Christy Moore
 Maureen Forrest
 Gerald Killeen
 Sean Creamer
 Jane McKenna
 Fáilte Isteach
 Taoiseach Bertie Ahern TD, Former UK Prime Minister Tony Blair MP, & Deputy First Minister, Martin McGuinness MP, MLA

2006
 Tommy Tiernan
 Munster Rugby Squad
 Anita McCluskey
 James Nesbitt
 Mags Riordan
 Alan Kerins
 Chinedu Onyejelem

2005
 Terry Wogan, "Ireland's Greatest Living Entertainer"
 Bob Geldof
 Sean Kelly
 Neil Burke, Donal Mooney Students of Palmerstown Community School
 Fr. Peter McVerry S.J.
 Bridgeen Hagans & the McCartney Sisters
 Marian Finucane
 David Joyce

2004
 Sonia O'Sullivan
 Emma Synnott
 Fr Kieran Creagh CP
 Patrick McAweeney
 Johnathan Irwin & Jack & Jill Foundation
 Iseult O'Malley, Siobhán Phelan & Peter Ward
 Rev. Roy Magee

2003
 Mary Davis, Person of the Year
 Dermot Weld
 Peter Canavan
 Ita Bourke (posthumous)
 Michael Elmore-Meegan, International Person of the Year
 Niall Mellon
 Ciara McMahon, (joint) Young Person of the Year
 Niamh Ni Dhoibhlin, (joint) Young Person of the Year

2002
 Niall Quinn
 Rosemary Daly
 Caroline Casey, (joint) Young Person of the Year
 Joe Kernan
 T.K. Whitaker
 Colm O’Gorman
 Martin Gildea
 Francis Fitzsimons

2001
 Fr J Linus Ryan
 Kathryn Sinnott
 Aidan O’Brien
 Daráine Ni Mhaolmhichil
 Tony Paget
 Sorcha McKenna
 Fr Mychal Judge & New York City Rescue Services

2000
 Maeve Binchy
 Sean Scollan
 Ted & Ruby Walsh
 Rita Lawlor
 Dr Mo Mowlam
 The Boyne Rescue & Recovery Service
 Christina Noble

1990s

1999
 Tom Hyland
 Eddie Jordan
 Michael Colgan
 Dr. Harry Counihan
 The Coveney Family
 Dr. Anthony O’Reilly
 Ronan Keating
 Dr Mary McLoughlin
 Mamo McDonald
Una gallagher

1998
 Queva Griffin, double organ transplant recipient 
 Dr. Jerry Cowley
 Sophia McColgan
 Brian Kerr
 Anna May McHugh of the National Ploughing Championships
 Dominic Pinto
 Senator George Mitchell

1997
 Lainey Keogh
 Michael Martin
 Jane O'Brien
 Micheal O'Muircheartaigh
 Seamus Stack
 Julia Windle
 Mary Robinson

1996
 Dr. Mary Redmond
 Michelle Smith
 Bridie Lynch
 Elizabeth O'Farrell
 Jer O'Donoghue
 Pat & Nuala Matthews
 Dr. Derek Hill
 Veronica Guerin

1995
 Ger Loughnane
 Martin Naughton
 Derek Nally
 Dr. D. Colbert
 Maureen Potter
 Gerardo V. Garcia (PDI)
 Sonya Doyle
 R. McDermott
 Noel McDonagh

1994
 Jim Callery & Luc Dodd
 Moya Doherty & Bill Whelan
 Jane Feehan
 Sr. Jennifer McAleer
 Dr. Patrick McKeon
 Ellen Mongan
 Norma Smurfit
 Martina Daly & Jean Withers

1993
 Paddy Doyle
 Noel C. Duggan
 Sonia O'Sullivan
 Garda Agnes Reddy
 Dr. Joseph Robins
 Adi Roche
 Sr. Carmel Walsh
 J. Dawson Stelfox

1992
 Sgt. Michael Carruth & Mr Wayne McCullough
 Brian McEniff
 Sr. Eileen Fahey
 Prof. Fred Given
 Kilkee Marine Rescue Recovery Service
 Seamus Kinsella
 Martin Naughton
 John O'Shea

1991
 Tarlach De Blacam
 Kenneth Branagh
 Jim Connolly
 The Cooley S.T.O.P. Committee
 Dr. Edward Culleton
 Brian Friel
 Catherine Joyce
 Dr. Thomas McGinley

1990
 Sr. Aquinas
 Packie Bonner
 Joseph Fennell
 Davoren Hanna
 John B. Keane
 Kay Murphy
 Eamon O’Leary
 Brian Keenan
 Brenda Gillham
 Elaine Spence
 Daniel St Ledger

1980s

1989
 Peter Sutherland
 Shauna McWilliams
 Brian Banks
 Gary O'Toole
 Mary Moriarty
 Denis Mulcahy
 Patrick Mulcahy
 Joan McGinley
 Liam Skelly
 Seamus Heaney

1988
 Tommy Boyle
 Jack Charlton O.B.E.
 Carmencita Hederman
 Ollie Jennings
 Alice Leahy
 Maureen O’Mahony
 Norma Smurfit
 Gordan Walsh

1987
 Anna Curtin
 Noel C. Duggan
 Stanley Gillespie
 Shelia Greenfield
 Sr. Ignatius Phelan & Sr. Francis Rose O'Flynn
 Donncha Ó Dúlaing
 John O'Shea
 Stephen Roche

1986
 Denis Brosnan
 Cathal McDonagh
 Gary Hynes
 Neil Jordan
 William A. Houlihan
 Rev. Cecil Kerr
 Susan McKenna-Lawlor
 Jonjo O'Neill

1985
 Barry McGuigan
 Sr. Vincent Devlin
 Gerry Joyce
 Gay Byrne
 William Harford Rutherford
 P. V. Doyle
 Sean Davey
 Bob Geldof
PC John Myhill

1984
 Barry O’Donnell
 Prem Puri
 John Bermingham
 Michael O'Hehir
 Maeve Calthorpe
 Patrick O'Connell
 Feargal Quinn
 John Hume MP, MEP
 John Parker

1983
 Sheila Goldberg
 Coilin O h'larnain
 Carol Moffett
 Joan Denise Moriarty
 Mary O'Donoghue
 Canon Billy Wynne
 Ireland Special Olympics Team
 Detective Inspector Denis Mullins

1982
 Fr. Harry Bohan
 Irene Daly
 James Doogan
 Garda Eamon Doyle
 Sr. Colette Dwyer
 Pól Ó Foighil
 Joseph Hughes
 Dr. Michael J. Kileen
 Thomas McGarry
 Seamus McGuire
 Prof. Tom Raftery
 Dr. T. K. Whitaker
 Monica Wilson

1981
 Rick Bourke
 Frank Cahill
 Br. Kevin Crowley OFM, CAP
 Mary Dunlop
 James Hughes
 Freda Lyness
 Kevin O’Doherty
 Tony McNamara
 Christopher Nolan
 Bridgid O'Lynn
 Thomas Stephens
 Jerry Tyrrell

1980
 Sr. Anna
 Tony Barry
 Cecelia Carroll
 Iris Doreen Charles
 Lorna Daly
 Mildred Dugan
 Lady Valerie Goulding
 Katherine Lyons
 Very Rev. James Canon McDyer P.P.
 Philip A. Mullally
 Rev. Fr. Eoin Murphy
 Donal O'Connor N.T.
 Major General James J. Quinn

1970s

1979
 Willie Bermingham
 Dr. J.E. De Courcy Ireland
 Rev. Dean Griffin
 Rev. Monsignor Horan, for his work in arranging the visit of Pope John Paul II to the Republic of Ireland
 Sr. Marian
 Dr. Charles Mollan
 Ms G. Morris
 Denis O’Brien
 Eric Peard
 Dr. Patricia Sheehan
 Eva Wall
 Gisela Whyte

1978
 Ivy Bourke
 Sr. Joan Bowles
 Tony Byrne P.C.
 Joan Carr
 Rev. Ray Davey M.B.E.
 Dr. Muriel Gahan
 Matthew Kirwan
 Vera Montgomery
 Dr. Marie Mulcahy
 Christine E. O’Rourke
 Marie Roycroft
 Bro. Aloysius Shannon O.H.

1977
 Criostoir De Baroid
 Sr. M. Consillio Fitzgerald 
 H.J. Egar
 Mary Hanley
 T.J. Hargadon
 Sr. Kevin Kerin
 Dr. Brendan Menton & Don Seery of Home Farm F.C.
 Tom & Senator Joe McCartin
 Mary F. O'Brien
 Arthur O'Flaithearta
 Eileen Proctor
 Dr Barbara Stokes

1976
 Betty Williams
 Mairead Corrigan
 Joseph O’Brien
 Bro. Vivian Cassells
 T. Pearce Leahy
 S.H.A.R.E.
 Megan Maguire
 Dr. Jopphn F. Fleetwood
 Sean Cooney
 Bridie Maguire
 Rev. W. Sydney Callaghan
 Michael O’Regan
 Most Rev. Dr. Birch

1975
 Col. Joseph Adams
 James Anderson
 Dr. Joseph Barnes
 Maureen Black
 Joseph Connolly
 Thomas C. Fallon
 Patricia Keeley
 Patrick J. Leahy
 Sr. M. Nicholas O.P.
 Patrick J. O’Brien
 Maura O’Dea
 Stephen Whittle

References

External links
Official website
People of the Year Award - List of Winners

Lists of award winners
Lists of Irish people
Irish award winners